Sarai Nurnagar is a small village in Mansurchak Block in Begusarai District of Bihar state, India. It comes under Sarai Nurnagar panchayat. It is located 36 km toward north from District headquarters Begusarai.

Geography

The geographical coordinates i.e. latitude and longitude of Sarai Nurnagar is 25.6163 and 85.9138 respectively.

References

Begusarai district
Villages in Begusarai district
Caravanserais in India